The 1996 season in the Latvian Higher League, named Virslīga, was the sixth domestic competition since the Baltic nation gained independence from the Soviet Union on 6 September 1991. Tenth teams competed in this edition, with Skonto FC claiming the title.

First round

Match table

Second round

Championship group

Match table

Relegation group

Match table

Relegation play-offs
The matches were played on 29 October and 3 November 1996.

|}

Top scorers

Awards

Skonto FC 1996

References
RSSSF
Skonto FC 1996

Latvian Higher League seasons
1
Latvia
Latvia